Disks large-associated protein 3 (DAP-3) also known as SAP90/PSD-95-associated protein 3 (SAPAP-3) is a protein that in humans is encoded by the DLGAP3 gene.

Clinical significance
Mutations in DLGAP3 have been associated with trichotillomania.

References